Vesela Dolyna is a village in Kremenchuk Raion, Poltava Oblast (province) of Ukraine. 

Until 18 July 2020, Vesela Dolyna was located in the Hlobyne Raion. The raion was abolished in July 2020 as part of the administrative reform of Ukraine, which reduced the number of raions of Poltava Oblast to four. The area of Hlobyne Raion was merged into Kremenchuk Raion.

References

Notes

Villages in Kremenchuk Raion